Ammopelmatus cahuilaensis (commonly known as the Coachella Valley Jerusalem cricket) is a species of insect in the family Stenopelmatidae. The species is found in the Coachella Valley and was described by Ernest R. Tinkham in 1968, in The Great Basin Naturalist.

Type specimen
The holotype specimen is a male and is at the California Academy of Sciences. According to Tinkham, the species can be distinguished from other Jerusalem crickets as follows: Foretibiae bearing only two ventral apical spurs immediately posterioradly of the third and fourth calcars. Caudal tibiae with three dorsal apical or subapical teeth on each margin.

Range and habitat
It is endemic to the United States, specifically the Coachella Valley of California.  They have been found from the Snow Creek to the sand dune areas surrounding the Palm Springs airport.  Their preference is for sandy to somewhat gravelly soil and are considered a sand obligate species. They are found associated with the roots of local sunflower species, Ambrosia sp. and Encelia sp.

Despite the arid environments in which they are found, they prefer high humidity and are most commonly observed following winter or spring rainstorms.beneath surface debris.  During the hot and dry summer they pass daylight hours in deep burrows, only occasionally being found on the surface at night. Their preference for the western edge of the valley, which is cooler and more moist than the eastern part, may mean that they have a highly restricted range.

Their food preference is for tubers, roots, and various plant detritus, but have also been observed consuming dead animals and are occasionally cannibalistic. The females lay small clusters of large eggs in soil pockets. Their life cycle may extend for three or more years.

Sources

References

Insects of the United States
Stenopelmatoidea
Insects described in 1968
Taxonomy articles created by Polbot
Fauna of the Coachella Valley
Fauna of the Colorado Desert
Fauna of Riverside County, California
Fauna of the Sonoran Desert
Taxobox binomials not recognized by IUCN